These Same Skies is 27th live album by Australian worship group Hillsong Worship. The album was released on November 5, 2021, by Hillsong Music and Capitol CMG. The album features appearances by Benjamin Hastings, Mi-kaisha Rose, Reuben Morgan, Brooke Ligertwood, Aodhan King, and Saye Pratt. Production was handled by Brooke Ligertwood and Michael Guy Chislett.

These Same Skies was preceded by the release of "Hope of the Ages" as the lead single from the album, with "Never Walk Alone" and "That's The Power" being released as promotional singles.

These Same Skies debuted at number fifteen on Billboard's Top Christian Albums Chart in the United States, as well as the Official Charts' Official Christian & Gospel Albums Chart in the United Kingdom.

Background
On 8 October 2021, Hillsong Worship announced These Same Skies as their forthcoming album slated for release on 5 November 2021, being availed for digital pre-order. These Same Skies was recorded in Orange County, California, marking the first Hillsong Worship project to be recorded entirely in the United States. Chris Davenport of Hillsong Worship shared the meaning behind the album's title, saying:

Release and promotion

Singles
Hillsong Worship released a studio-recorded version of "Hope of the Ages" alongside Reuben Morgan and Cody Carnes on 20 August 2021.

Promotional singles
Hillsong Worship released "Never Walk Alone" featuring Mi-kaisha Rose as the first promotional single from the album on 8 October 2021.

Hillsong Worship released "That's The Power" featuring Benjamin Hastings as the second promotional single from the album on 22 October 2021.

Critical reception

Joshua Andre in his 365 Days of Inspiring Media review gave a positive review of the album, saying: "These Same Skies is an album that needs to be listened to despite everything that happened to Hillsong the church." Christian Ellis of The Christian Beat concluded in his review that "Hillsong Worship’s These Same Skies reminds us that under the skies we live under, He’s still doing what only what He can do – making something good out of us." JubileeCast's Timothy Yap gave a favourable review of the album, saying: "Hillsong Worship is such a mainstay in contemporary worship music that you can always count on them delivering church-friendly songs. This one's no exception. It's full of songs ready to serve the church in the honor of our Lord Jesus Christ." Reviewing for NewReleaseToday, Kevin Davis opined that "These Same Skies is loaded with several stirring new worship songs that really set me in the proper mindset to praise God for loving me so much that He gave His life away for all that was lost. I really enjoy the exciting musical vibe of this album, and the melodies are catchy, and the lyrics are prayerful."

Accolades

Commercial performance
In the United States, These Same Skies debuted at number fifteen on the Top Christian Albums Chart

In the United Kingdom, These Same Skies debuted on the OCC's Official Christian & Gospel Albums Chart at number fifteen.

Track listing

Personnel

Vocals
Brooke Ligertwood – lead vocals, acoustic guitar, piano 
Reuben Morgan – lead vocals, acoustic guitar 
Joel Houston – lead vocals, acoustic guitar 
 Chris Davenport – lead vocals, acoustic guitar, piano 
 Benjamin Hastings – lead vocals, guitars
 Aodhan King – lead vocals 
 Mi-kaisha Rose – lead vocals 
 Saye Pratt – lead vocals 

Musicians
Michael Guy Chislett – producer, electric guitar 
Dylan Thomas – electric guitar 
 Dan McMurray – drums

Charts

Release history

References

External links

Hillsong Music live albums
2021 live albums